Many of the states in the United States have established the post of poet laureate to which a prominent poet residing in the respective state is appointed. The responsibilities of the state poets laureate are similar to those of the Poet Laureate of the United Kingdom and the equivalent Poet Laureate Consultant in Poetry to the Library of Congress in the United States, to make public appearances at poetry readings or literary events, and to promote awareness of poetry within their geographical region.

, 46 states and the District of Columbia have poets laureate, although a few are presently vacant. The terms can vary in length from state to state. Most states appoint a poet laureate for a one- or two-year term, fewer to several years, and some states appoint a poet to a lifetime tenure. Two states, New Jersey and Pennsylvania, previously had such posts but abolished them in 2003. Michigan had a single poet laureate from 1952–1959. There has never been an official State Poet Laureate in Massachusetts. While Idaho does not have a post of "poet laureate", per se, the state appoints a "Writer in Residence", which can be held by a novelist or poet. Alaska has similarly expanded their program to include other genres of writing, calling the program the Alaska State Writer Laureate. The state of New York has both a State Poet and a State Author.

List of state poets laureate
The following lists of state poets laureate below are divided by state. The name of the current poet laureate is in bold.

Alabama

The current poet laureate of Alabama is Ashley M. Jones. Alabama has had an official poet laureate since 1930. The Alabama Writer's Cooperative (formerly the Alabama Writers' Conclave), described as "a voluntary organization of Alabama historians, playwrights, fiction writers, poets, and newspaper writers" first recommended Samuel Minturn Peck to Governor Bibb Graves. The state legislature approved a bill to create the office on March 5, 1931.  After the death of Dr. Peck, the position was not filled and was revived in 1954 due to the efforts Mary B. Ward, the president of the Alabama Writer's Conclave, who became the state's second laureate.

At present, a poet selected must have been an Alabama resident for at least 15 years prior to the appointment, and when commissioned by the governor, is appointed to serve one four-year term. Before 1983, neither the organization or the state statute provided for a specific term length. The Alabama Writers' Cooperative will recommend candidate who is elected by the organization's membership at its annual meeting. The governor subsequently commissions the candidate. A candidate for poet laureate need not be a member of the Alabama Writers' Cooperative to be nominated or selected.

Alaska

Originally created as the position of Poet Laureate in 1963 (House Resolution 25). The official name was changed in 1996 to recognize and honor all genres of writing. The position is selected by the Alaska State Council on the Arts.
Poets laureate of Alaska include:

 Margaret Mielke (1963-1965)
 Oliver Everette (1965-1967)
 John Haines (1969)
 Ruben Gaines (1973)
 Sheila Nickerson (1977)
 Richard Dauenhauer (1981)
 Joanne Townsend (1988)
 Tom Sexton (1995)
 Richard Nelson (2000)
 Anne Hanley (2002-2004)
 Jerah Chadwick (2004-2006)
 John Straley (2006-2008)
 Nancy Lord (2008-2010)
 Peggy Shumaker (2010-2012)
 Nora Marks Dauenhauer (2012-2014)
 Frank Soos (2014-2016)
 Ernestine Hayes (2016-2018)

Arizona

The state of Arizona established a state Poet Laureate position in 2013, appointing Alberto Ríos as the inaugural Poet Laureate.

Arkansas

Charles T. Davis was the first until his death on December 21, 1945. The position was vacant from 1946 until 1953, when Rosa Zagnoni Marinoni was appointed. Upon Marinoni’s death in 1970, Governor Winthrop Rockefeller named Ercil Brown interim laureate. When legislature reconvened, three candidates had emerged: Anna Nash Yarborough, Lily Peter, and Brown. The legislature declined to decide and instead in 1971 passed Act 90, which assigned the responsibility to the governor. Governor Dale Bumpers announced Lily Peter’s appointment on October 6, 1971. Following Peter’s death, Verna Lee Hinegardner was appointed by Governor Bill Clinton on October 4, 1991, serving until 2003. In 2003, Governor Mike Huckabee appointed Peggy Vining. Before this time, the poet laureateship had been considered a life appointment and publicity ensued but in the end the appointment stood. Peggy Vining served as Poet Laureate from 2003 until her death in 2017. The Legislature changed the term for Arkansas Poet Laureate during 2017 to 4 years. The current Poet Laureate of Arkansas is Jo McDougall of Little Rock, Arkansas. The current Poet Laureate of Arkansas is Suzanne Underwood Rhodes, who was appointed to a four-year term in 2022.

Poets laureate of Arkansas:
 Charles T. Davis (1923-1945)
 Rosa Zagnoni Marinoni (1953-1970)
 Ercil Brown (interim appointee, 1970-1971)
 Lily Peter (1971-1991)
 Verna Lee Hinegardner (1991-2003)
 Peggy Vining (2003-2017)
 Jo Garret McDougall (2018-2022)
 Suzanne Underwood Rhodes (2022-present)

California

The position is currently vacant. It was last held by Dana Gioia from 2015 to 2018.

Colorado

Colorado Poets Laureate are appointed to four-year terms. They are nominated by Colorado Creative Industries and Colorado Humanities & Center for the Book, and chosen by the Governor. The State of Colorado also appointed singer/songwriter writer John Denver in 1974.

The following have held the position: 
Alice Polk Hill (1919-1921)
Nellie Burget Miller (1923-1952)
Margaret Clyde Robinson (1952-1954)
Milford E. Shields (1954-1975)
Thomas Hornsby Ferril (1979-1988)
Mary Crow (1996-2010)
David Mason (2010-2014)
Joseph Hutchison (2014-2019)
Bobby LeFebre (2019-present)

Connecticut

The Poet Laureate of Connecticut was established in 1985 by Public Act 85-221 of the Connecticut General Assembly. Five-year residents of the state with a demonstrated career in poetry are eligible for the honorary appointment as an advocate for poetry and literary arts.

The following have held the position: 
 James Merill (1985–1995)
 Leo Connellan (1996–2001)
 Marilyn Nelson (2001–2007)
 John Hollander (2007–2009)
 Dick Allen (2010–2015) 
 Rennie McQuilkin (2015–2018)
 Margaret Gibson (2019–2022)
 Antoinette Brim-Bell (2022 - 2025)

Delaware

Poets are appointed to the position by the governor. Nnamdi Chukwuocha and Albert Mills—twin brothers who are known as the "Twin Poets"—are the current Poets Laureates of Delaware. They were appointed on December 13, 2015. According to the Library of Congress, they are the first co-laureates appointed by a state and the first siblings to share the position.

The following have held the position:
 Edna Deemer Leach (1947-1949)
 Jeannette Slocum Edwards (1950-1953)
 Frances Shannon Flowers (McNeal) (1954)
 Katherine King Johnson (1955)
 David Hudson (1956-1960)
 Alison Kimball Bradford (1961)
 Margaret Eleanor Weaver (1962)
 Mother Aloysius Peach (1963-1964)
 Dr. Percival R. Roberts, III (1965-1966)
 Joyce Carlson (1967-1968)
 Antonia Bissell Laird (1969-1970)
 Dr. Harry O. Eisenberg (1971)
 David Hudson (1975-1976)
 E. Jean Lanyon (1979-1981)
 Dr. Fleda Brown (2001-2007)
 Dr. JoAnn Balingit (2008-2015)
 Nnamdi Chukwuocha and Albert Mills (2019-present)

District of Columbia

The United States' capital, the District of Columbia, created the position of Poet Laureate of the District of Columbia in 1984 during the mayoralty of Marion Barry. The position is filled by appointment from the mayor of the district the DC Commission on the Arts and Humanities. The District of Columbia's poet laureate program is currently stalled.
Only two poets laureate have been appointed since the creation of the position. Sterling Allen Brown was appointed by Mayor Marion Barry, serving from 1984 until his death in 1989. Dolores Kendrick was appointed by Mayor Anthony A. Williams, serving from 1999 until her death in 2017.

Florida

Poets Laureate of Florida are appointed by the governor and the Division of Arts and Culture. They first served lifetime, unpaid appointments, until June 20, 2014, when HB 513 established a four-year term. The first poet laureate of Florida was Franklin L. Wood, appointed in 1929 and died soon after assuming office. Vivian Laramore Rader was appointed in 1931 and served until her death in 1975. Edmund Skellings was appointed in 1980. A stroke that impaired his speech and limited his ability to do all of his official duties. He died August 19, 2012, leaving the post vacant.Peter Meinke currently holds this position and was appointed on June 15, 2015.

Georgia

The current poet laureate of Georgia is Chelsea Rathburn, appointed in 2019.

Hawaii

Prior to statehood Don Blanding, originally from Oklahoma, was unofficially referred to as the poet laureate of Hawaii. In 1951 Hawaii Territorial Senator Thelma Akana Harrison in concurrent resolution 28, declared Lloyd Stone, who was originally from California, poet laureate. When the modern program was established, Native Hawaiian Kealoha was appointed on on May 3, 2012 by Governor Neil Abercrombie., and he is the first poet laureate for the state of Hawaii, serving through 2022.

Idaho

Irene Welch Grissom served from 1923 to 1948 as Idaho's first poet laureate. Sudie Stuart Hager served as the second poet laureate from 1949 to 1982. After 1982 the title was changed to Writer in Residence.

Illinois

The state's first three Poets Laureate were named at the initiative of individual governors and served for life. In 2003 the title was made into a four-year renewable award. 

Those who have served in the position include:
 Howard Austin (January 14, 1936-April 1, 1962)
 Carl Sandburg (February 28, 1962-July 22, 1967)
 Gwendolyn Brooks (January 3, 1968-December 4, 2000)
 Kevin Stein (December 11, 2003-December 1, 2017)
 Angela Jackson (2020-Present) 

Illinois' governor posthumously named songwriter John Prine honorary poet laureate in 2021.

Indiana

Indiana has the unique situation of having two posts: an official "state poet laureate", created in 2005, that is occupied
by Matthew Graham, and the unofficial post of "premier poet" created in 1929 occupied by Sarah E. Morin.

Iowa

The position was created July 1, 1999 by Subchapter 303.89 of the Iowa Code with a two-year renewable term. Marvin Bell was Iowa's first Poet Laureate, from 2000 to 2004, followed by Robert Dana from 2004 to 2008, and Mary Swander from 2009 to 2019. Debra Marquart is the current Poet Laureate of Iowa. Her two year term started in May 2019.

Kansas

The current poet laureate of Kansas is Huascar Medina, serving from 2019 to 2021. Predecessors include Jonathan Holden, Denise Low, Eric McHenry, Caryn Mirriam-Goldberg, and Wyatt Townley.

Kentucky

From the creation of the poet laureate position in 1926 until 1990, the state legislature appointed poets to lifetime terms as poets laureate. Several poets held the position at the same time. Since 1990, Kentucky state law provides for the appointment of a poet laureate or writer laureate to one two-year term selected by the governor. The statute, Kentucky Revised Statutes Section 153.600 provides for two duties: (1) "Make a presentation on Kentucky Writers' Day" and (2) "Act as a writing consultant to the State Department of Education and Kentucky Department for Libraries and Archives". The position comes without salary, although the laureate "may be reimbursed for expenses". According to the Kentucky Arts Council, the Kentucky poet laureate is charged with "promoting the literary arts and leading the state in literary activities, including Kentucky Writers’ Day"—a holiday held on 24 April "to commemorate the birthday of Kentuckian Robert Penn Warren, the first poet laureate of the United States". The poet laureate is inducted on this date at the Writers' Day festivities every other year.

Louisiana

The current poet laureate of Louisiana is Mona Lisa Saloy appointed in April 2021. Predecessors include Ava Leavell Haymon, Julie Kane, Peter Cooley, and John Warner Smith.

Maine

The current poet laureate of Maine is Julia Bouwsna. Predecessors include Wesley McNair, Baron Wormser, and Betsy Sholl.

Maryland

The current poet laureate of Maryland is Grace Cavalieri, appointed in 2018.

Massachusetts

Massachusetts has never had an official poet laureate.

Michigan

Edgar A. Guest was the first and only Michigan Poet Laureate, a title he held from 1952 until his death in 1959.

Minnesota

Mississippi

The current poet laureate of Mississippi is Catherine Pierce.

Missouri

Missouri's poet laureate was established by an executive order from the governor. The order outlined a post with a two-year term, to be filled by "a published poet, a resident of Missouri, be active in the poetry community, and be willing and able to promote poetry in the state of Missouri". The order requires that the appointee "promote the arts in Missouri by making public appearances at public libraries and schools across the state" and "compose an original poem in honor of Missouri" Missouri's poet laureate serves without compensation.

Montana

The current poet laureate of Montana is Mark Gibbons, appointed in August 2021. Predecessors include Sheryl Noethe
and Henry Real Bird.

Nebraska

The current Nebraska State Poet is Matt Mason, serving 2019-2023. Twyla Hansen served from 2013-2018, following William Kloefkorn who was the first Nebraskan to be given the title "Nebraska State Poet," which he held from 1982-2011. John Neihardt, who was appointed Nebraska poet laureate in 1921, retains the title of Poet Laureate of Nebraska "in perpetuity".

Nevada

This post is currently vacant. Mildred Breedlove (1904–1994) was named poet laureate in 1957, but disputed with officials over a commissioned work. Norman Kaye, a songwriter, was appointed in the 1960s although he had (and has) not published any poetry. He was named "laureate emeritus" in 2007 but no replacement was announced.

New Hampshire

The current poet laureate of New Hampshire is Alexandria Peary, appointed October 2019. Predecessors include W. E. Butts, Richard Eberhart, Patricia Fargnoli, Cynthia Huntington, and Jane Kenyon.

New Jersey

New Jersey no longer has a poet laureate position. It existed for less than four years and was abolished by the legislature effective 2 July 2003.

The state legislature created in 1999 the post as part of a biennial award called the New Jersey William Carlos Williams Citation of Merit. The 1999 act, codified as N.J.S.A. 52:16A-26.9, provided for a panel of four poets from New Jersey selected by the New Jersey State Council on the Arts the New Jersey Council for the Humanities would convene to select candidates for the position for the consideration of the state's governor. An incumbent poet laureate would be the fifth member of the panel that selected his successor.  The governor alone would appoint the poet laureate by presenting him or her with the New Jersey William Carlos Williams Citation of Merit. The poet laureate, serving for a two-year term, was expected to "engage in activities to promote and encourage poetry within the State" and "give no fewer than two public readings within the State each year".

The state legislature and governor abolished the post after the second poet laureate, Amiri Baraka incited a public controversy soon after his appointment with a public reading of his poem "Somebody Blew Up America" The poem was controversial and met with harsh criticism by literary critics, politicians, and the public. The poem was highly critical of racism in America, includes angry depictions of public figures, claimed Israel was involved in the World Trade Center attacks, and supported the theory that the United States government knew about the 9/11 attacks in advance. Critics accused Baraka of racism and anti-Semitism. Baraka refused to resign, and because the statute did not allow the governor to remove him from the post, the state legislature and governor enacted legislation to abolish the position on 2 July 2003.

New Mexico

New Mexico appointed its first poet laureate, Levi Romero in 2020.

New York

The position of New York State Poet Laureate (official title: State Poet) was established by a special mandate of the New York State Legislature on August 1, 1985. Willie Perdomo is the current New York state poet laureate. In 1988 New York also established position for other genres of writing entitled New York State Author. In 2016 Governor Cuomo also named Joseph Tusiani Poet Laureate Emeritus.

Those who have held the position include:

 Stanley Kunitz (1987-1989)
 Robert Creeley (1989-1991)
 Audre Lorde (1991-1993)
 Richard Howard (1993-1995)
 Jane Cooper (1995-1997)
 Sharon Olds (1998-2000)
 John Ashbery (2001-2003)
 Billy Collins (2004-2006)
 Jean Valentine (2008-2010)
 Marie Howe (2012-2014)
 Yusef Komunyakaa (2015-2017)
 Alicia Ostriker (2018-2021)
 Willie Perdomo (2020-present)

North Carolina

The current poet laureate of North Carolina is Jaki Shelton Green; first appointed in 2018.

North Dakota

The position of poet laureate of North Dakota is currently vacant. It was previously occupied by Larry Woiwode, who was appointed in 1995 and served until his death in 2022.

Ohio 

In 2014, Ohio enacted law creating the position of Ohio poet laureate starting July 1, 2016. The Ohio Arts Council provides a list of candidates to the governor for selection to serve a two-year term, with the possibility of reappointment. The current Ohio Poet Laureate is Kari Gunter-Seymour, appointed to a term beginning June 10, 2020. She was subsequently reappointed to a two-year term beginning January 1, 2022. Previous Ohio Poets Laureate are Amit Majmudar (2016-2017) and Dave Lucas (2018-2019).

Oklahoma 

Oklahoma has appointed poets laureate since 1923. The current poet laureate of Oklahoma is Jay Snider.

Oregon

The current poet laureate of Oregon is Anis Mojgani, appointed in 2020 by Governor Kate Brown.

Pennsylvania
Pennsylvania appointed one poet, Samuel John Hazo, in 1993. He held the position for ten years before it was eliminated.

Rhode Island

The State Poet of Rhode Island, established in 1987, is codified in Chapter 42-100 of the State of Rhode Island General Laws. The five-year appointment by the Governor carries an annual salary of $1,000.

The following have held the position:
 Michael S. Harper (1988–1993)
 C.D. Wright (1994–1999)
 Tom Chandler (2000–2007)
 Lisa Starr (2007–2012)
 Rick Benjamin (2013–2016)
 Tina Cane (2016– )

South Carolina

The sixth poet laureate of South Carolina, generally a lifetime position, is Marjory Heath Wentworth was appointed in 2003 by Governor Mark Sanford pursuant to SC Code, Sec. 1-3-230 She resigned in 2020.

South Dakota

The first poet laureate was appointed in 1937, and a permanent office of poet laureate of South Dakota was created by legislation in 1959. The Governor has the authority to appoint a candidate who has received a recommendation from the South Dakota State Poetry Society. The appointment was indefinite, "during the pleasure of the Governor", until 2015, when the term was set at four years. Past appointees have lifetime emeritus status.

The following have held the position:

 Charles "Badger" Clark (1937–1957)
 Audrae Visser (1974-October 2001)
 David Allan Evans (2002–2014, retired)
 Lee Ann Roripaugh (2015–2019)
 Christine Stewart-Nunez (2019–2023)

Tennessee

The 87th Tennessee General Assembly appointed Richard M. "Pek" Gunn as first poet laureate for life in it 1971–1972 session. He died in 1995. The current poet laureate of Tennessee is Margaret Britton Vaughn was appointed in 1999.

Texas

The current poet laureate of Texas is Lupe Mendez, appointed in 2021.

Utah

The Utah State Poet Laureate Program was established in 1997. As a joint project of the Governor's Office and the Utah Arts Council Literature Program, the Governor appoints the Utah Poet Laureate for a five-year term.

Previous poets laureate:
 David Lee (1997–2003)
 Ken Brewer (2003–2006)
 Katharine Coles (2006–2012)
 Lance Larsen (2012 – 2017)
 Paisley Rekdal (2017–2022)
 Lisa Bickmore (2022-present)

Vermont

Robert Frost was the first poet named as Laureate by Joint House Resolution 54 of the Vermont General Assembly in 1961, less than two years before his death. The current position of State Poet, a four-year appointment, was created by Executive Order 69 in 1988. In 2007, the designation was changed to Poet Laureate.

The following have held the position:
 Robert Frost (1961-1963)
 Galway Kinnell (1989–1993)
 Louise Gluck (1994–1998)
 Ellen Bryant Voigt (1999–2002)
 Grace Paley (2003–2007)
 Ruth Stone (2007–2011)
 Sydney Lea (2011–2015)
 Chard deNiord (2015–2019)
Mary Ruefle (2019– )

Virginia

The current poet laureate of is Virginia is Luisa Igloria, appointed in 2020 to a two-year term.

Washington

Although the Washington State Federation of Women's Clubs named Ella Higginson poet laureate in 1931, there was no official position until House Bill 1279 was signed into law in 2007. The position was unfilled for two years due to a budget shortfall, and resumed without state funding.

The following have served:
 Samuel Green (2007–2009)
 unfilled (2010–2011)
 Kathleen Flenniken (2012–2014)
 Elizabeth Austen (2014–2016)
 Tod Marshall (2016–2018)
 Claudia Castro Luna (2018– )

West Virginia

West Virginia established the position of Poet Laureate by statute in 1927. The appointment was defined by statue as "at the pleasure of the Governor", but has become an indefinitely renewable two-year term. The following have served:
 Karl Myers (1927–1937)
 Roy Lee Harmon (March 12, 1937 – 1943)
 James Lowell McPherson (1943–1946)
 Roy Lee Harmon (October 11, 1946 – 1960)
 Vera Andrews Harvey (1960–1961)
 Roy Lee Harmon (March 7, 1961 – 1979)
 Louse McNeil (Pease) (1979–1993)
 Irene McKinney (1994–2012)
 Marc Harshman (2012– )

Wisconsin

The position and nominating commission was created by executive order from Governor Tommy Thompson on July 31, 2000. On February 4, 2011, Governor Scott Walker discontinued state sponsorship and sent a letter to the members of the Wisconsin Poet Laureate Commission to inform them it has been terminated. The Wisconsin Academy of Sciences, Arts & Letters assumed the role of the commission May of that year.
The Poets laureate of Wisconsin are:
 Ellen Kort (2001–2004)
 Denise Sweet (2005–2008)
 Marilyn Taylor (2009–2010)
 Bruce Dethlefsen (2011–2012; incumbent when the state discontinued the commission)
 Max Garland (2013–2014)
 Kimberly Blaeser (2015–2016)
 Karla Huston (2017-2018)
 Margaret Rozga (2019–2020)
 Dasha Kelly Hamilton (2021– )

Wyoming

The position of Poet Laureate was created by executive order in 1981 with a variable term of service. The post became a customary two-year term starting on statehood day (July 10). The current poet laureate of Wyoming is Eugene M. Gagliano appointed in 2016 and reappointed in 2018.

The past poets laureate are:
 Peggy Simson Curry (January 14, 1981 – January 20, 1987)
 Charles L. Levendosky (January 4, 1988 – 1995)
 Robert Roripaugh (July 21, 1995 – 2003)
 David Romtvedt (August 15, 2004 – January 3, 2011)
 Patricia Frolander (November 7, 2011 – June 9, 2013)
 Echo Roy Klaproth (July 10, 2013 – July 8, 2015)
 A. Rose Hill (July 9, 2015 – July 10, 2016)

Notes

External links

U.S. state poets laureate – a comprehensive guide at the Library of Congress
Alaska state poet laureate
California state poet laureate
Connecticut state poet laureate
Delaware state poet laureate
Georgia state poet laureate
Illinois state poet laureate
Official state poems
Washington state poet laureate
Washington state poet laureate

American poetry

United States
Poet Laureate